Bruce Walton may refer to:

Bruce Walton (American football) (1951–2019), American football player
Bruce Walton (baseball) (born 1962), American baseball player